The Brazil national football team, nicknamed Seleção Canarinha ("Canary Squad", after their bright yellow jersey), represents Brazil in men's international football and is administered by the Brazilian Football Confederation (CBF), the governing body for football in Brazil. They have been a member of FIFA since 1923 and a member of CONMEBOL since 1916.

Brazil is the most successful national team in the FIFA World Cup, being crowned winner five times: 1958, 1962, 1970, 1994 and 2002. The Seleção also has the best overall performance in the World Cup competition, both in proportional and absolute terms, with a record of 76 victories in 114 matches played, 129 goal difference, 247 points, and 19 losses. It is the only national team to have played in all World Cup editions without any absence nor need for playoffs, and the only team to have won the World Cup in four different continents: once in Europe (1958 Sweden), once in South America (1962 Chile), twice in North America (1970 Mexico and 1994 United States), and once in Asia (2002 South Korea/Japan). Brazil is also the most successful team in the now-defunct FIFA Confederations Cup, winning it four times, in 1997, 2005, 2009, and 2013.

In ranking standings, Brazil have the highest average football Elo rating, and the fourth all-time peak football Elo rating, established in 1962. In FIFA's ranking system Brazil holds the record for most Team of the Year first ranking wins with 13. Many commentators, experts, and former players have considered the Brazil team of 1970 to be the greatest team of all time. Other Brazilian teams are also highly estimated and regularly appear listed among the best teams of all time, such as the Brazil teams of 1958–62 and the squads of the 1994–02 period, with honorary mentions for the gifted 1982 side. In 1996, the Brazil national team achieved 35 consecutive matches undefeated, a feat which they held as a world record for 25 years.

Brazil has developed many rivalries through the years, with the most notable ones being with Argentina—known as the Superclássico das Américas in Portuguese, Italy—known as the Clássico Mundial in Portuguese or the World Derby in English, Uruguay due to the traumatic Maracanazo, and the Netherlands due to several important meetings between the two teams at several World Cups.

History

Early history (1914–1922) 

It is generally believed that the inaugural game of the Brazil national football team was a 1914 match between a Rio de Janeiro and São Paulo select team and the English club Exeter City, held in Fluminense's stadium. Brazil won 2–0 with goals by Oswaldo Gomes and Osman, though it is claimed that the match was a 3–3 draw.

In contrast to its future success, the national team's early appearances were not brilliant. Other early matches played during that time include several friendly games against Argentina (being defeated 3–0), Chile (first in 1916) and Uruguay (first on 12 July 1916). However, led by the goalscoring abilities of Arthur Friedenreich, they were victorious at home in the South American Championships in 1919, repeating their victory, also at home, in 1922.

First World Cup and title drought (1930–1949) 
In 1930, Brazil played in the first World Cup, held in Uruguay. The squad defeated Bolivia but lost to Yugoslavia, being eliminated from the competition. They lost in the first round to Spain in 1934 in Italy, but reached the semi-finals in France in 1938, being defeated 2–1 by eventual winners Italy. Brazil were the only South American team to participate in this competition.

The 1949 South American Championship held in Brazil ended a 27-year streak without official titles. The last one had been in the 1922 South American Championship, also played on Brazilian soil.

The 1950 Maracanazo 

After that, Brazil first achieved international prominence when it hosted the 1950 FIFA World Cup. The team went into the last game of the final round, against Uruguay at Estádio do Maracanã in Rio, needing only a draw to win the World Cup. Uruguay, however, won the match and the Cup in a game known as "the Maracanazo". The match led to a period of national mourning.

For the 1954 World Cup in Switzerland, Brazil was then almost completely renovated, with the team colours changed (to a new design by Aldyr Schlee) from all white to the yellow, blue and green of the national flag, to forget the Maracanazo, but still had a group of star players. Brazil reached the quarter-final, where they were beaten 4–2 by tournament favourites Hungary in one of the ugliest matches in football history, known as the Battle of Berne.

Pelé and the First Golden Era (1958–1970) 

For the 1958 World Cup, Brazil were drawn in a group with England, the USSR and Austria. They beat Austria 3–0 in their first match, then drew 0–0 with England. Before the match, coach Vicente Feola made three substitutions that were crucial for Brazil to defeat the Soviets: Zito, Garrincha and Pelé. From the kick-off, they kept up the pressure relentlessly, and after three minutes, which were later described as "the greatest three minutes in the history of football", Vavá gave Brazil the lead. They won the match by 2–0. Pelé scored the only goal of their quarter-final match against Wales, and they beat France 5–2 in the semi-final. Brazil then beat Sweden 5–2 in the final, winning their first World Cup and becoming the first nation to win a World Cup title outside of its own continent. Pelé described it tearfully as a nation coming of age.

In the 1962 World Cup, Brazil earned its second title with Garrincha as the star player, a mantle and responsibility laid upon him after the regular talisman, Pelé, was injured during the second group match against Czechoslovakia and unable to play for the rest of the tournament.

In the 1966 World Cup, Brazil had their worst performance in a World Cup. The 1966 tournament was remembered for its excessively physical play, and Pelé was one of the players most affected. Against Portugal, several violent tackles by the Portuguese defenders caused Pelé to leave the match and the tournament. Brazil lost this match and was eliminated in the first round of the World Cup for the first time since 1934. They have not failed to reach the knockout stages of the competition since. Brazil became the second nation to be eliminated in the first round while holding the World Cup crown following Italy in 1950. After the 1998, 2002, 2010, 2014 and 2018 World Cups, France, Italy, Spain and Germany were also added to this list. After the tournament, Pelé declared that he did not wish to play in the World Cup again. Nonetheless, he returned in 1970.

Brazil won its third World Cup in Mexico in 1970. It fielded what has since then often been considered the best World Cup football squad ever, led by Pelé in his last World Cup finals, captain Carlos Alberto Torres, Jairzinho, Tostão, Gérson and Rivelino. Even though Garrincha had retired, this team was still a force to be reckoned with. They won all six of their games—against Czechoslovakia, England and Romania during group play, and against Peru, Uruguay and Italy in the knockout rounds. Jairzinho was the second top scorer with seven goals, and is the only player to score in every match in a World Cup; Pelé finished with four goals. Brazil lifted the Jules Rimet trophy for the third time (the first nation to do so), which meant that they were allowed to keep it. A replacement was then commissioned, though it would be 24 years before Brazil won it again.

The dry spell (1974–1990) 
After the international retirement of Pelé and other stars from the 1970 squad, Brazil was not able to overcome the Netherlands at the 1974 World Cup in West Germany, and finished in fourth place after losing the third place game to Poland.

In the second group stage of the 1978 World Cup, Brazil competed with tournament hosts Argentina for top spot and a place in the finals. In their last group match, Brazil defeated Poland 3–1 to go to the top of the group with a goal difference of +5. Argentina had had a goal difference of +2, but in its last group match, it defeated Peru 6–0, and thus qualified for the final in a match accused of ultimately-unproven match fixing. Brazil subsequently beat Italy in the third place play-off, and were the only team to remain unbeaten in the tournament.

At the 1982 World Cup, held in Spain, Brazil were the tournament favorites, and easily moved through the early part of the draw, but a 3–2 defeat in Barcelona to Italy, in a classic World Cup match, eliminated them from the tournament in the match that they refer to as "Sarriá's Tragedy", referencing the stadium's name. The 1982 team, with a midfield of Sócrates, Zico, Falcão and Éder, is remembered as perhaps the greatest team never to win a World Cup.

Several players, including Sócrates and Zico, from 1982 returned to play at the 1986 World Cup in Mexico. Brazil, still a very good team and more disciplined defensively than four years earlier, met the Michel Platini-led France in the quarter-finals in a classic of Total Football. The game played to a 1–1 draw in regulation time, and after a goalless extra time, it all came down to a penalty shoot-out, where Brazil was defeated 4–3.

After a 40-year hiatus, Brazil was victorious in the 1989 Copa América, this being their fourth victory in four tournaments hosted in Brazil. This achievement ended Brazil's 19-year streak absent a championship. The last one had been in the 1970 World Cup.

At the 1990 World Cup in Italy, Brazil was coached by Sebastião Lazaroni, that had been the coach in the 1989 Copa América. With a defensive scheme, whose main symbol was midfielder Dunga, forward Careca and three centre-backs, the team lacked creativity but made it to the second round. Brazil was eliminated by Diego Maradona-led Argentina in the round of 16 in Turin, losing to their South American archrivals 1–0.

The Second Golden Era (1994–2002) 

Brazil went 24 years without winning a World Cup or even participating in a final. Their struggles ended at the 1994 tournament in the United States, where a solid side headed by Romário and Bebeto in attack, captain Dunga in midfield, goalkeeper Cláudio Taffarel and defender Jorginho, won the World Cup for a then-record fourth time. Highlights of their campaign included a 1–0 victory over the United States in the round of 16 at Stanford University, a 3–2 win over the Netherlands in the quarter-finals in Dallas, and a 1–0 victory over Sweden in the semi-finals at Pasadena's Rose Bowl. This set up Brazil–Italy in the final in Pasadena. A game played in searing heat which ended as a goalless draw, with Italy's defence led by Franco Baresi keeping out Romário, penalty kicks loomed, and Brazil became champions with Roberto Baggio missing Italy's last penalty. Despite the triumph, the 1994 World Cup winning team is not held in the same high esteem in Brazil as their other World Cup winning teams. FourFourTwo magazine labelled the 1994 team "unloved" in Brazil due to their pragmatic, defensive style over the more typical Brazilian style of attacking flair.

Entering the 1998 World Cup as defending champions, Brazil finished runner-up. Having topped their group and won the next two rounds, Brazil beat the Netherlands on penalties in the semi-final following a 1–1 draw. Player of the tournament Ronaldo scored four goals and made three assists en route to the final. The build up to the final itself was overshadowed by Ronaldo suffering a convulsive fit only hours before kick off. The starting line up without Ronaldo was released to a shocked world media, but after pleading that he felt fine and requested to play, Ronaldo was reinstated by the coach, before giving a below par performance as France, led by Zidane won 3–0.

Fuelled by the "Three R's" (Ronaldo, Rivaldo and Ronaldinho), Brazil won its fifth championship at the 2002 World Cup, held in South Korea and Japan. Brazil beat all three opponents in group play in South Korea and topped the group. In Brazil's opening game against Turkey, in Ulsan, Rivaldo fell to the ground clutching his face after Turkey's Hakan Ünsal had kicked the ball at his legs. Rivaldo escaped suspension but was fined £5,180 for play-acting, and became the first player ever to be punished in FIFA's crackdown on diving. In their knockout round matches in Japan, Brazil defeated Belgium 2–0 in Kobe in the round of 16. Brazil defeated England 2–1 in the quarter-finals in Shizuoka, with the winning goal coming from an unexpected free-kick by Ronaldinho from 40 yards out. The semi-final was against Turkey in Saitama; Brazil won 1–0. The final was between Germany and Brazil in Yokohama, where Ronaldo scored two goals in Brazil's 2–0 triumph. Ronaldo also won the Golden Shoe as the tournament's leading scorer with 8 goals. Brazil's success saw them receive the Laureus World Sports Award for Team of the Year.

Brazil won the 2004 Copa América, their third win in four competitions since 1997.
Brazil also won the 2005 FIFA Confederations Cup for the second time. Manager Carlos Alberto Parreira built his side through a 4–2–2–2 formation. Nicknamed the "Magic quartet", the attack was built around four players: Ronaldo, Adriano, Kaká and Ronaldinho.

World Cup drought (2006–present) 

In the 2006 World Cup, Brazil won its first two games against Croatia (1–0) and Australia (2–0). In the final group game against Japan, Brazil won 4–1. Ronaldo scored twice and equalled the record for the most goals scored across all World Cups. In the round of 16, Brazil beat Ghana 3–0. Ronaldo's goal was his 15th in World Cup history, breaking the record. Brazil, however, was eliminated in the quarter-finals against France, losing 1–0 to a Thierry Henry goal.

Dunga was hired as Brazil's new team manager in 2006. Brazil then won the 2007 Copa América, where forward Robinho was awarded the Golden Boot and named the tournament's best player. Two years later, Brazil won the 2009 FIFA Confederations Cup, defeating the U.S. 3–2 in the final, to seal their third Confederations Cup title. Kaká was named as the player of the tournament while striker Luís Fabiano won the top goalscorer award.

At the 2010 World Cup in South Africa, Brazil won their first two matches against North Korea (2–1) and the Ivory Coast (3–1), respectively. Their last match, against Portugal, ended in a 0–0 draw. They faced Chile in the round of 16, winning 3–0, although in the quarter-final they fell to the Netherlands 2–1.

In July 2010, Mano Menezes was named as Brazil's new coach. At the 2011 Copa América, Brazil lost against Paraguay and was eliminated in the quarter-finals. On 4 July 2012, due to a lack of competitive matches because the team had automatically qualified for the 2014 World Cup as tournament hosts, Brazil was ranked 11th in the FIFA ranking.

Return of Luiz Felipe Scolari (2013–2014) 
In November 2012, coach Mano Menezes was sacked and replaced by Luiz Felipe Scolari.

On 6 June 2013, Brazil was ranked 22nd in the FIFA ranking, their lowest-ever rank. Brazil entered the 2013 Confederations Cup with the objective of defending their title. In the final, Brazil faced Spain, winning 3–0 and sealing their fourth Confederations Cup title. Neymar was named player of the tournament and received the Golden Ball Award and the Adidas Bronze Shoe, and Júlio César won the Golden Glove Award for the best goalkeeper of the tournament.

2014 FIFA World Cup 

In the opening match of the 2014 World Cup against Croatia, two goals from Neymar and one from Oscar saw the Seleção off to a winning start in their first World Cup on home soil in 64 years. The team then drew with Mexico, before confirming qualification to the knockout stage by defeating Cameroon 4–1 with Neymar again scoring twice, and Fred and Fernandinho providing further goals. Brazil faced Chile in the round of 16, taking an 18th-minute lead through David Luiz's first goal for the Seleção in a 1–1 draw. Brazil prevailed 3–2 on penalties, with Neymar, David Luiz and Marcelo converting their kicks, and goalkeeper Júlio César saving three times.

The team again faced South American opposition in the quarter-final, defeating Colombia 2–1 with goals from central defenders David Luiz and the team captain Thiago Silva. Late in the match, Neymar was stretchered off after Juan Camilo Zúñiga's knee had made contact with the forward's back. Neymar was taken to hospital and was diagnosed with a fractured vertebra, ruling him out for the remainder of the tournament. Prior to this, Neymar had scored four goals, provided one assist, and been named man of the match twice. Brazil faced further problems ahead of their semi-final against Germany, as Thiago Silva was to serve a one-match suspension for receiving his second yellow card of the tournament in the quarter-final.

The Seleção went on to lose 1–7 to the Germans – their biggest ever defeat at the World Cup and first home loss in a competitive match since 1975. Towards the end of the match, the home crowd began to "olé" each pass from the German team, and booed their own players off the pitch after the final whistle. The match has been nicknamed the Mineirazo, making reference to the nation's previous World Cup defeat on home soil, the Maracanazo against Uruguay in 1950, and the Estádio do Mineirão where the match took place. Brazil subsequently lost 0–3 to the Netherlands in the third-place play-off match. The team ended the tournament with the worst defensive record of the 32 competing nations, having conceded 14 goals. The only other countries to concede 12 or more goals in the current World Cup format are North Korea and Saudi Arabia. Following these results, Scolari announced his resignation.

Return of Dunga (2014–2016) 

On 22 July 2014, Dunga was announced as the new manager of Brazil, returning to the position for the first time since the team's exit at the 2010 World Cup.

Dunga's first match in his second reign as Brazil's manager was a friendly match against 2014 World Cup quarter-finalists Colombia at Sun Life Stadium in Miami on 5 September 2014, with Brazil winning the match 1–0 through an 83rd-minute Neymar free-kick goal. Dunga followed this up with wins against Ecuador (1–0), in the 2014 Superclásico de las Américas against Argentina (2–0), against Japan (4–0), against Turkey (0–4), and against Austria (1–2). Dunga continued Brazil's winning streak in 2015 by defeating France 3–1 in another friendly. They followed this with wins against Chile (1–0), Mexico (2–0) and Honduras (1–0).

2015 Copa América 
Brazil started the tournament with a victory against Peru after coming from behind by 2–1 (with Douglas Costa scoring in the dying moments), followed by a 1–0 defeat against Colombia and a 2–1 victory against Venezuela. In the knockout stage, Brazil faced Paraguay and was eliminated after drawing 1–1 in normal time and losing 4–3 in the penalty shootout. As such, Brazil was unable to qualify for a FIFA Confederations Cup (in this case, the 2017 edition) for the first time in almost 20 years.

Copa América Centenario 
Brazil began the 2016 Copa América Centenario with a scoreless draw against Ecuador, with the Ecuadorians having a goal wrongly disallowed in the second half. This was followed by an emphatic 7–1 victory over Haiti, with Philippe Coutinho scoring a hat-trick. Needing only a draw to progress to the knockout stage of the tournament, Brazil suffered a controversial 1–0 loss to Peru, with Raúl Ruidíaz scoring in the 75th minute by guiding the ball into the net with his arm. This loss, Brazil's first loss to Peru since 1985, saw Brazil eliminated from the tournament in the group stage for the first time since 1987.

Tite era (2016–2022) 

On 14 June 2016, Tite replaced Dunga as manager of Brazil. Tite, who had managed Corinthians, the 2015 Brazilian champions and 2012 Club World Cup champions, was confirmed as his replacement six days later. Tite's debut was marked with a 3–0 away victory against Ecuador on 2 September, followed by a 2–1 win over Colombia, a 5–0 win against Bolivia and a 0–2 victory away against Venezuela, bringing Brazil to the top of the World Cup Qualifiers leaderboard for the first time since 2011. Brazil then defeated Paraguay 3–0 to become the first team, other than the hosts Russia, to qualify for the 2018 World Cup.

Brazil started their 2018 World Cup campaign with a draw against Switzerland – Brazil's goal coming from a 25-yard bending strike from Philippe Coutinho – their first non-win in an opener since 1978. In the following match against Costa Rica on 22 June, goals from Coutinho and Neymar in stoppage time saw Brazil win 2–0. They won their final group game 2–0 over Serbia with goals from Paulinho and Thiago Silva, meaning qualification for the last 16 as group winners. On 2 July, goals from Neymar and Roberto Firmino saw Brazil 2–0 win over Mexico to advance to the quarter-finals. On 6 July, Brazil were eliminated from the 2018 World Cup by Belgium in the quarter-finals, losing 2–1, with Fernandinho scoring an own goal for Belgium while Renato Augusto scored the only goal for Brazil.

In spite of World Cup failure, the CBF continued to trust Tite and allowed him to continue his job as coach of Brazil for the 2019 Copa América held at home. However, Brazilian perpetration for the tournament at home was hampered by the injury of Neymar in a friendly match where Brazil thrashed 2019 AFC Asian Cup champions Qatar 2–0. Despite this loss, Tite managed Brazil to their first Copa América title since 2007. Brazil overcame Bolivia  after a goalless first half and Peru in a celebratory 5–0 demolition. Between these matches, Brazil drew Venezuela in a 0–0 draw with three goals ruled out by VAR. Brazil met Paraguay in the quarter-finals where they won a 4–3 penalty shootout after a goalless draw. In the semi-finals Brazil beat neighboring Argentina 2–0 to set up a rematch with Peru. In the final, Brazil managed to defeat the Peruvians once again 3–1 to conquer their ninth Copa América title.

On 8 June 2021, Brazil beat Paraguay 2–0 in a World Cup qualifier in Asunción – the first time they had won in the country since 1985. In the 2022 World Cup, Brazil finished first in their group, having beaten Serbia 2–0, Switzerland 1–0, and losing 1–0 to Cameroon. The team then faced South Korea in the round of 16, winning with a 3-goal margin, and progressed to the quarterfinals where they eventually lost 4–2 on penalties to Croatia. Following their exit from the World Cup, Tite resigned as head coach.

Team image

Uniforms 

Brazil's first team colors were white with blue collars, but following the defeat at Maracanã in the 1950 World Cup, the colors were criticised for lacking patriotism. With permission from the Brazilian Sports Confederation, the newspaper Correio da Manhã held a competition to design a new kit incorporating the four colors of the Brazilian flag. The winning design was a yellow jersey with green trim and blue shorts with the white trim drawn by Aldyr Garcia Schlee, a nineteen-year-old from Pelotas. The new colors were first used in March 1954 in a match against Chile, and have been used ever since. Topper were the manufacturers of Brazil's kit up to and including the match against Wales on 11 September 1991; Umbro took over before the next match, versus Yugoslavia in October 1991. Nike began making Brazil kits in late 1996, in time for the 1997 Copa América and the 1998 World Cup.

The use of blue and white as the second kit colors owes its origins to the defunct latter day Portuguese monarchy and dates from the 1930s, but it became the permanent second choice accidentally in the 1958 World Cup Final. Brazil's opponents were Sweden, who also wear yellow, and a draw gave the home team, Sweden, the right to play in yellow. Brazil, who travelled with no second kit, hurriedly purchased a set of blue shirts and sewed on them the badges taken from their yellow shirts.

Kit sponsorship

Nicknames 
The Brazil national team is known by different names in various parts of the world. Nicknames for the squad in Brazil include: Canarinho, meaning 'Little Canary', a reference to a species of bird commonly found in Brazil that has a vivid yellow color, this phrase was popularized by the late cartoonist Fernando "Mangabeira" Pieruccetti during the 1950 World Cup despite the team not wearing the color yet back then; Amarelinha (Little Yellow One), Seleção (The National Squad), Verde-amarela (The Green and Yellow), Pentacampeão (Five-time Champions), and Esquadrão de Ouro (The Golden Squad). Some Latin American commentators often refer to the Brazil team as El Scratch (The Scratch), among others.

Training camp 

Granja Comary was opened in 1987, and underwent significant renovations in 2013 and 2014.

Results and fixtures 

The following is a list of match results from the previous 12 months, as well as any future matches that have been scheduled.

2022

2023

Coaching staff

Players

Current squad 
The following 23 players were called up for a friendly against Morocco on 25 March 2023.

Recent call-ups 
The following players have been called up to the Brazil squad in the last 12 months.

 INJ Player withdrew from the squad due to injury
 SUS Player served suspension
 WIT Player withdrew from the squad due to non-injury issue

Individual records

Manager records 
Mário Zagallo became the first person to win the FIFA World Cup both as a player (1958 and 1962) and as a manager (1970). In 1970, when he was of age 38, he won the FIFA World Cup which made him the second youngest coach to win the FIFA World Cup. While still in Brazil as an assistant coach, the team won the 1994 FIFA World Cup.

Competitive record
 Champions   Runners-up   Third place    Fourth place    Tournament played fully or partially on home soil

FIFA World Cup

Brazil has qualified for every FIFA World Cup they entered, never requiring a qualifying play-off. With five titles, they have won the tournament on more occasions than any other national team.

*Draws include knockout matches decided via penalty shoot-out.

Copa América

FIFA Confederations Cup

Olympic Games

Head-to-head record

Honours

Major competitions 
 FIFA World Cup:
 Champions (5): 1958, 1962, 1970, 1994, 2002
 Runners-up (2): 1950, 1998
 Third place (2): 1938, 1978
 Fourth place (2): 1974, 2014
 South American Championship / Copa América:
 Champions (9): 1919, 1922, 1949, 1989, 1997, 1999, 2004, 2007, 2019
 Runners-up (12): 1921, 1925, 1937, 1945, 1946, 1953, 1957, 1959 (Argentina), 1983, 1991, 1995, 2021
 Third place (7): 1916, 1917, 1920, 1942, 1959 (Ecuador), 1975, 1979
 Fourth place (3): 1923, 1956, 1963
Panamerican Championship:
 Champions (2): 1952, 1956
 Runners-up (1): 1960
 CONCACAF Gold Cup:
 Runners-up (2): 1996, 2003
 Third place (1): 1998
FIFA Confederations Cup:
 Champions (4): 1997, 2005, 2009, 2013
 Runners-up (1):1999
 Fourth place: (1): 2001

South American tournaments 
 Roca Cup / Superclásico de las Américas (vs ):
 Winners (12): 1914, 1922, 1945, 1957, 1960, 1963, 1971 (shared), 1976, 2011, 2012, 2014, 2018
 Copa Confraternidad (vs ):
 Winners: 1923
 Copa 50imo Aniversario de Clarín (vs ):
 Winners: 1995
 Copa Río Branco (vs ):
 Winners (7): 1931, 1932, 1947, 1950, 1967 (shared), 1968, 1976
 Copa Rodrigues Alves (vs ):
 Winners (2): 1922, 1923
 Taça Oswaldo Cruz (vs ):
Winners (8): 1950, 1955, 1956, 1958, 1961, 1962, 1968, 1976
 Copa Bernardo O'Higgins (vs ):
 Winners (4): 1955, 1959, 1961, 1966 (shared)
  Copa Teixeira (vs ):
 Winners: 1990 (shared)
 Taça Jorge Chavéz / Santos Dumont (vs ):
 Winners: 1968

Olympic Games 

 Olympic Games:
 Runners-up (2): 1984, 1988
 Fourth place (1): 1976
 CONMEBOL Pre-Olympic Tournament:
 Champions (5): 1968, 1971, 1976, 1984, 1987
 Runners-up (1): 1964
 Third place (1): 1960

Friendlies 
 Taça Interventor Federal (vs EC Bahia):
 Winners: 1934
 Taça Dois de Julho (vs Bahia XI):
 Winners: 1934
 Copa Emílio Garrastazú Médici (vs ):
 Winners: 1970
 Taça Independência:
 Winners: 1972
 Taça do Atlântico:
 Winners (3): 1956, 1970, 1976
 U.S.A. Bicentennial Cup Tournament:
 Winners: 1976
 Taça Centenário Jornal O Fluminense (vs Rio de Janeiro XI):
 Winners: 1978
 Saudi Crown Prince Trophy (vs Al Ahli Saudi FC):
 Winners: 1978
 Rous Cup:
 Winners: 1987
 Australia Bicentenary Gold Cup:
 Winners: 1988
 Amistad Cup:
 Winners: 1992
 Umbro Cup:
 Winners: 1995
 Nelson Mandela Challenge:
 Winners: 1996
 Lunar New Year Cup:
 Winners: 2005
 Kirin Challenge Cup:
 Winners: 2022

Awards 
 FIFA Team of the Year:
 Winners (13): 1994, 1995, 1996, 1997, 1998, 1999, 2000, 2002, 2003, 2004, 2005, 2006, 2022
 World Soccer Team of the Year
Winners (2): 1982, 2002
 Laureus World Team of the Year
 Winners: 2003
 FIFA World Cup Fair Play Trophy:
 Winners (4): 1982, 1986, 1994, 2006
 FIFA Confederations Cup Fair Play Trophy:
 Winners (2): 1999, 2009
 Copa América Fair Play Trophy:
 Winners (2): 2019, 2021

Chronology of titles

Summary

See also 

 Brazil national football team results (2010–19)
 Brazil national under-23 football team
 Brazil national under-20 football team
 Brazil national under-17 football team
 Brazil national futsal team
 Brazil national beach soccer team
 Brazilian football songs
 List of Brazil national football team managers

Citations

Sources

External links 

 Official website 
 Brazil FIFA profile
 Brazilian Football – Guide to Football in Brazil
 RSSSF Brazil
 All about Brazilian Football – Sambafoot.com

 
FIFA Confederations Cup-winning countries
FIFA World Cup-winning countries
South American national association football teams
Football